Emotionalism is an album released in 2007 by folk artists The Avett Brothers under Ramseur Records.  The album's widespread success launched The Avett Brothers into the national spotlight, catching the eye of producer Rick Rubin who would go on to produce their next album I And Love And You.

Emotionalism was also the first album to introduce cellist Joe Kwon to their ensemble, who would become a permanent member of the band.

The track Will You Return? is used as the theme song for the television show A Chef's Life.

Track listing
All tracks by The Avett Brothers.

"Die, Die, Die" – 2:50
"Shame" – 3:53
"Paranoia in B-Flat Major" – 3:37
"The Weight of Lies" – 4:29
"Will You Return?" – 2:46
"The Ballad of Love and Hate" – 5:20
"Salina" – 4:44
"Pretty Girl from Chile" – 5:42
"All My Mistakes" – 5:07
"Living of Love" – 4:31
"I Would Be Sad" – 3:44
"Pretty Girl from San Diego" – 3:50
"Go to Sleep"- 4:04
"Hand-Me-Down Tune" – 4:07
"In the Curve" (iTunes Bonus Track) – 3:44
"Tales of Coming News" (iTunes Bonus Track) – 5:20

Personnel 
The Avett Brothers
 Seth Avett – lead & backing vocals, acoustic & electric guitars, piano, organ, glockenspiel, drums, percussion
 Scott Avett – lead & backing vocals, banjo, acoustic & electric guitars, piano, drums, percussion
 Bob Crawford – backing vocals, upright & electric bass, saxophones, bass clarinet, trumpet, percussion

Additional musicians
 Joe Kwon – cello (5, 7, 10, 13, 14), vocals (12)
 Paleface – vocals, harmonica, guitar (13)
 Donny Herron – fiddle (8, 13)
 Monica Samalot – drums (13)

Charts

References 

The Avett Brothers albums
2007 albums